Christel Rupke (7 March 1919 – 16 November 1998) was a German swimmer. She competed in the women's 100 metre backstroke at the 1936 Summer Olympics.

References

External links
 

1919 births
1998 deaths
German female swimmers
Olympic swimmers of Germany
Swimmers at the 1936 Summer Olympics
People from Solingen
Sportspeople from Düsseldorf (region)
20th-century German women